The Fostoria Red Birds were a minor league baseball team based in Fostoria, Ohio from 1937 to 1941. First known as the Fostoria Cardinals in 1936, Fostoria teams played as exclusively as members of the Class D level Ohio State League and for their entire existence, the franchise played as a minor league affiliate of the St. Louis Cardinals. Fostoria hosted minor league home games at Redbird Park.

History
The Fostoria Cardinals began minor league baseball play in 1936 as members of the six–team Class D level Ohio State League. The "Cardinals" moniker reflected the franchise as an affiliate of the St. Louis Cardinals. Joining Fostoria in the six–team Ohio State League in 1936 were the Fremont Reds, Mansfield Tigers, New Philadelphia Red Birds (also a St. Louis Cardinals affiliate), Sandusky Sailors and Tiffin Mud Hens.

Beginning play in the 1936 Ohio State League, the Fostoria Cardinals placed 3rd with a 40–50 record, playing the season under managers Harry Aldrick and George Silvey. Silvey began the season managing the New Philadelphia Red Birds, who folded on May 26, 1936 after eight games. On May 27, 1936, in a game at Redbird Park, the Fostoria Cardinals defeated the Fremont Reds by a score of 27–12. The Cardinals finished 15.0 games behind the 1st place Tiffin Mud Hens in the final Ohio State League regular season standings. Fostoria pitcher Steve Vargo led the 1936 Ohio State League with 156 strikeouts and Cardinal player Ed Zipay led the league in hitting, with a .419 batting average.

Continuing play in the 1937 Ohio State League season, the team became the "Fostoria Red Birds" while remaining as an affiliate of the St. Louis Cardinals, a partnership that would continue for the duration of the franchise. The 1937 Red Birds finished a distant last in the six–team league. With a 20–68 record, Fostoria placed 6th under managers John Cavanaugh, Red Jenkins (twice), Rex Bowen and Harry Aldrick. The Red Birds finished 41.5 games behind the 1st place Mansfield Red Sox in the final standings.

The 1938 Fostoria Red Birds won the Ohio State League pennant, as the Ohio State League played the 1938 season as a four–team league. With a regular season record of 55–41, Fostoria finished 1st in the standing, managed by Jack Farmer. The Red Birds finished 3.0 games ahead of the 2nd place Fremont Reds/Green Sox in the regular season standings. In the Ohio State League final, Fostoria lost to Fremont 3 games to 0. Player/manager Jack Farmer led the Ohio State League with 164 strikeouts.

As the Ohio State League returned to a six–team league 1939, Fostoria again qualified for the playoffs. The Red Birds placed 3rd in the regular season with a 66–63 record under returning player/manager Jack Farmer, finishing 1.5 games behind the 1st place Findlay Oilers. The Red Birds lost in first round of the playoffs to Findlay 2 games to 0. Fostoria pitcher Fred Berger led the Ohio State League with 231 strikeouts.

The Fostoria Red Birds finished in 5th place in the 1940 Ohio State League. Managed by Bobby Jones, Fostoria ended the season with a 44–73 record, finishing 40.0 games behind the 1st place Lima Pandas.

In their final season of play, the 1941 Fostoria Red Birds finished 4th in the six–team Ohio State League. With a record of 49–57 under managers Lee Ellison and Charles Cronin, Fostoria finished 21.5 games behind the 1st place Fremont Green Sox. In 1941, Jim Pruett of Fostoria led the Ohio State League in hitting with a .340 batting average. After the 1941 season, the Ohio State League ceased play until 1944 due to World War II. Fostoria did not field a franchise when the Ohio State League returned to play, Fostoria has not hosted another minor league team since the 1941 Red Birds.

Ballpark
The Fostoria teams played home games at Redbird Park. The ballpark had a capacity of 1,500 in 1939 and dimensions of (Left, Center, Right): 340–445–340 in 1939. Redbird Park was located at 201 South Main Street, Fostoria, Ohio.

Timeline

Year–by–year records

Notable alumni

Pat Capri (1938–1939)
Glenn Crawford  (1939)
Al LaMacchia (1939)
Johnny Lucadello (1936)
Tony Lucadello (1936)

See also
Fostoria Red Birds players

References

External Links
Baseball Reference

Defunct minor league baseball teams
Professional baseball teams in Ohio
Defunct baseball teams in Ohio
Baseball teams established in 1937
Baseball teams disestablished in 1941
St. Louis Cardinals minor league affiliates
Fostoria, Ohio
Ohio State League teams